George Patterson may refer to:

George Patterson (advertiser) (1890–1968), Australian advertising pioneer
George Patterson Y&R, an Australasian advertising agency
George Patterson (baseball), outfielder during the 1884 Philadelphia Keystones season
George Patterson (basketball) (1939–2003), basketball player
George Patterson (cricketer) (1868–1943), Philadelphian cricketer
George Patterson (football manager) (1887–1955), English football manager
George Patterson (footballer, born 1934), English professional footballer
George Patterson (Scottish footballer) (1909–?), Scottish footballer
George Patterson (ice hockey) (1906–1977), ice hockey player
George Patterson (missionary) (1920–2012), Scottish missionary doctor
Ben Patterson (politician) (George Benjamin Patterson, born 1939), Member of European Parliament
George Robert Patterson (1863–1906), United States Representative from Pennsylvania
George Sutton Patterson (1887–1953), Canadian representative on UNTCOK
George W. Patterson (1799–1879), United States Representative from New York
George W. Patterson (Oregon politician) (1857–1932), state senator from Oregon
George Patterson (died 1984), founder of Georgian Wicca

See also
George Paterson (disambiguation)